Tanasvan (also Romanized as Tanasvān and Tansavān; also known as Tansavār, Tansevān, Temesvar, and Temsavār) is a village in Golian Rural District, in the Central District of Shirvan County, North Khorasan Province, Iran. At the 2006 census, its population was 353, in 78 families.

References 

Populated places in Shirvan County